Dauletbike Yakhshimuratova (born 4 December 1991) is an Uzbekistani freestyle wrestler. She won one of the bronze medals in the women's 48 kg event at the 2017 Asian Indoor and Martial Arts Games held in Ashgabat, Turkmenistan.

Career 

In 2014, she competed in the women's freestyle 48 kg event at the World Wrestling Championships held in Tashkent, Uzbekistan. She was eliminated from the competition in her first match, against Carolina Castillo of Colombia. In that same year, she also represented Uzbekistan at the 2014 Asian Games in the women's freestyle 48 kg event but failed to win a medal; she was eliminated from the competition by Vinesh Phogat of India.

She lost her bronze medal match against Kim Hyung-joo of South Korea in the women's freestyle 50 kg event at the 2018 Asian Games in Jakarta, Indonesia. The following year, she competed in the women's freestyle 50 kg event at the 2019 World Wrestling Championships held in Nur-Sultan, Kazakhstan. She was eliminated from the competition in her second match, against Oksana Livach of Ukraine.

In 2019, at the Golden Grand Prix Ivan Yarygin held in Krasnoyarsk, Russia, she won one of the bronze medals in the women's 50 kg event. In 2020, she won one of the bronze medals in the women's 50 kg event at the Asian Wrestling Championships held in New Delhi, India. In 2021, she competed at the Asian Olympic Qualification Tournament hoping to qualify for the 2020 Summer Olympics in Tokyo, Japan. She did not qualify at this tournament and she also failed to qualify for the Olympics at the World Olympic Qualification Tournament held in Sofia, Bulgaria.

Achievements

References

External links 
 

Living people
1991 births
Place of birth missing (living people)
Uzbekistani female sport wrestlers
Wrestlers at the 2014 Asian Games
Wrestlers at the 2018 Asian Games
Asian Games competitors for Uzbekistan
Asian Wrestling Championships medalists